δ-Amyrin synthase (SlTTS2 (gene)) is an enzyme with systematic name (3S)-2,3-epoxy-2,3-dihydrosqualene mutase (cyclizing, delta-amyrin-forming). This enzyme catalyses the following chemical reaction

 (3S)-2,3-epoxy-2,3-dihydrosqualene  delta-amyrin

The enzyme from tomato (Solanum lycopersicum) gives delta-amyrin, alpha-amyrin, beta-amyrin.

References

External links 
 

EC 5.4.99